The Peel Session is an EP by Bongwater, recorded in 1991 from sessions with John Peel but not released until 1992 on Strange Fruit.

Track listing

Personnel 
Adapted from The Peel Session liner notes.

Bongwater
Randolph A. Hudson III – guitar
Kramer – vocals, bass guitar
David Licht – drums
Ann Magnuson – vocals

Production and additional personnel
Dogbowl – guitar
Kevin Gaor – design
Michael Macioce – photography
Mike Robinson – production, engineering

Release history

References 

1992 EPs
Bongwater (band) albums
Live EPs
Peel Sessions recordings
Strange Fruit Records EPs